The House of Representatives Electoral Tribunal (HRET) is an electoral tribunal that decides election protests in the House of Representatives of the Philippines. It consists of six representatives and three justices of the Supreme Court of the Philippines, who are designated by the Chief Justice. The equivalent tribunals for elections to the upper house is the Senate Electoral Tribunal and for president is the Presidential Electoral Tribunal.  The tribunal is located at SET-HRET Building, Commission on Audit Compound, Quezon City.

Members of the Tribunal receive a monthly allowance of 100,000 Philippine pesos on top of their regular salaries.

In August 2020, the tribunal abandoned its old building in Quezon City when the city's Department of Building Official condemned it.

Current members
The chairman is always the third most senior associate justice of the Supreme Court that's sitting on the tribunal.

The three members from the Supreme Court are designated by the chief justice. While there's no regular occurrence on when a chief justice designates members, this is almost certainly done when there is a new justice of the Supreme Court.

The six members from the House of Representatives are named in a resolution of the House. This always happens at the organization of the chamber at the start of every new Congress.

These are the members in the 18th Congress, which first convened on July 22, 2019, and whose senators' terms ended on June 30, 2022.

Successful protests
1998 election:
Amelita Villarosa (Occidental Mindoro): disqualified in 2000, replaced by Ricardo Quintos.
2001 election:
Henry Lanot (Pasig): disqualified in 2004, replaced by Noel Cariño
Mark Jimenez (Manila): disqualified in 2003, not replaced
2004 election:
Anuar Abubakar (Tawi-Tawi): disqualified in 2006, replaced by Nur Jaafar
2007 election:
Danilo Fernandez (Laguna-1st): disqualified in 2009, reversed by the Supreme Court in 2010.
Alvin Sandoval (Malabon/Navotas): disqualified in 2009, replaced by Josephine Lacson-Noel
Henry Dueñas (Taguig-2nd): disqualified in 2010, replaced by Angelito Reyes
2013 election:
Harlin Abayon (Northern Samar): replaced by Raul Daza, reversed by the Supreme Court in 2016.
Philip Pichay (Surigao del Sur-1st): ousted in 2016, replaced by Mary Elizabeth Delgado-Ty
Regina Reyes Mandanas (Marinduque): disqualified in 2016, replaced by Lord Allan Jay Velasco
2016
None
2019
There are 34 cases pending at the start of the 18th Congress.

References

Judiciary of the Philippines
House of Representatives of the Philippines
Electoral courts